NNFCC is a consultancy company specialising in bioenergy, biofuels and bio-based products.

History
Established by the UK Government in 2003 as the National Non-Food Crops Centre (NNFCC) to help extend the competitive non-food uses of crops, NNFCC is now an international consultancy providing advice on the conversion of biomass to bioenergy, biofuels and bio-based products.

The company is based in the BioCentre on the York Science Park and was opened in November 2003 by Larry Whitty, Baron Whitty. The current Chief Executive Officer is Dr Jeremy Tomkinson and the chair of the Board of Directors is Professor Michael Roberts, CBE.

Company information
NNFCC specialises in providing information and knowledge on the supply of biomass, its use in industrial applications and the fate of biomaterials at their end-of-life.

NNFCC operate in five separate sectors:
 Feedstock
 Bioenergy
 Biofuels
 Bio-based products
 Biorefining

The company undertakes consultancy for a wide range of organisations, including British Airways, INEOS, BASF, Braskem and NatureWorks. NNFCC also receive funding and is a delivery partner for the UK Government's Department for Energy and Climate Change.

In addition to the consultancy offered by NNFCC, the company also have paid membership for businesses and individuals.

See also

 Non-Food Crops
 Advanced Biofuels
 Biofuels
 Bioliquids
 Biomass
 Bioplastic
 Biorefinery
 Anaerobic Digestion
 Hemp
 Vegetable oil

References

External links
 NNFCC Homepage
 The Official Source for Information on AD and Biogas
 BBC article: Future of biofuels
 Daily Telegraph article: Cars powered by rubbish 'in two years time'
 Guardian article: One day, all houses will be built this way

Agriculture companies of the United Kingdom
Bioenergy organizations
Biofuel in the United Kingdom
Department of Energy and Climate Change
Non-food crops
Organisations based in York
Organizations established in 2003
Private companies limited by guarantee of the United Kingdom
Research institutes in North Yorkshire
University of York